The genus Archigetes Leuckart, 1878 is unique among all tapeworms in that its species can mature in invertebrate hosts (Oligochaeta), in contrast to all other cestodes which have a vertebrate host.
All five species were described as plerocercoids in oligochaetes, but two of them were also described as adults in cypriniform fishes.

Species
According to WoRMS, there are five valid species:
 Archigetes brachyurus Mrázek, 1908 
 Archigetes cryptobothrius Wiśniewski, 1928
 Archigetes iowensis Calentine, 1962
 Archigetes limnodrili (Yamaguti, 1934) Kennedy, 1965
 Archigetes sieboldi Leuckart, 1878

References 

Eucestoda
Parasitic animals of mammals
Cestoda genera